Kathryn "Kate" Asner (born September 17, 1966) is an American actress. She is the daughter of Nancy Lou (Sykes) and actor Ed Asner. She has made guest appearances in popular shows such as Malcolm in the Middle, Star Trek: Deep Space Nine and Ally McBeal.

Filmography

Film

Television

References

External links

1966 births
American film actresses
American people of Lithuanian-Jewish descent
American people of Russian-Jewish descent
American television actresses
Jewish American actresses
Living people
21st-century American actresses
21st-century American Jews